Sander Aae Skotheim (born 31 May 2002) is a Norwegian multi-event athlete. He was a silver medalist at the 2023 European Athletics Indoor Championships.

Career
Skotheim won gold in Athletics at the 2019 European Youth Summer Olympic Festival in the decathlon in Baku, and silver at the 2021 European Athletics U20 Championships decathlon in Tallinn. In 2022, Stokheim won the senior indoor Norwegian championship in the heptathlon and individual indoor medals including the gold in the high jump, silver in the triple jump and bronze in the long jump. Stokheim also won gold in the senior outdoor Norwegian championships in 2022, triumphing in the 110 metres hurdles and the high jump.

Whilst competing at the 2022 World Athletics Championships Skotheim broke his personal best in the 100 metres, going under 11 seconds for the first time to set a new fastest time of 10.88 seconds. He also set a new personal best in the high jump as he reached a discipline winning mark of 2.17. After the first day of the event he was placed seventh overall before finishing fifteenth.

At the 2023 European Athletics Indoor Championships Skotheim finished with the silver medal in the heptathlon.

References

External links

2002 births
Living people
Sportspeople from Oslo
World Athletics Championships athletes for Norway
Norwegian decathletes